Burning Down the House: Fighting Fires and Losing Myself is a non-fiction memoir, written by Canadian writer Russell Wangersky, first published in April 2009 by Thomas Allen Publishers. In the book, the author chronicles his experiences as a volunteer firefighter in Nova Scotia and Newfoundland.

Awards and honours
Burning Down the House received the 2009 Edna Staebler Award for Creative Non-Fiction.

References

External links
Russell Wangersky, Home page

Canadian memoirs
Canadian non-fiction books
2009 non-fiction books
Thomas Allen Publishers books